8-bit clean is an attribute of computer systems, communication channels, and other devices and software, that handle 8-bit character encodings correctly. Such encoding include the ISO 8859 series and the UTF-8 encoding of Unicode.

History 
Until the early 1990s, many programs and data transmission channels were character-oriented and treated some characters, e.g., ETX, as control characters. Other assumed a stream of seven-bit characters, with values between 0 and 127; for example, the ASCII standard used only seven bits per character, avoiding an 8-bit representation in order to save on data transmission costs. On computers and data links using 8-bit bytes this left the top bit of each byte free for use as a parity, flag bit, or meta data control bit. 7-bit systems and data links are unable to directly handle more complex character codes which are commonplace in non-English-speaking countries with larger alphabets.

Binary files of octets cannot be transmitted through 7-bit data channels directly. To work around this, binary-to-text encodings have been devised which use only 7-bit ASCII characters. Some of these encodings are uuencoding, Ascii85, SREC, BinHex, kermit and MIME's Base64. EBCDIC-based systems cannot handle all characters used in UUencoded data. However, the base64 encoding does not have this problem.

SMTP and NNTP 8-bit cleanness
Historically, various media were used to transfer messages, some of them only supporting 7-bit data, so an 8-bit message had high chances to be garbled during transmission in the 20th century. But some implementations really did not care about formal discouraging of 8-bit data and allowed high bit set bytes to pass through. Such implementations are said to be 8-bit clean. In general, a communications protocol is said to be 8-bit clean if it correctly passes through the high bit of each byte in the communication process.

They specifically require the use of ASCII character set "transmitted as an 8-bit byte with the high-order bit cleared to zero" and some of these explicitly restrict all data to 7-bit characters.

For the first few decades of email networks (1971 to the early 1990s), most email messages were plain text in the 7-bit US-ASCII character set.

The  definition of SMTP, like its predecessor , limits Internet Mail to lines (1000 characters or less) of 7-bit US-ASCII characters.

Later the format of email messages was re-defined in order to support messages that are not entirely US-ASCII text (text messages in character sets other than US-ASCII, and non-text messages, such as audio and images).

 specifies "NNTP operates over any reliable bi-directional 8-bit-wide data stream channel." and changes the character set for commands to UTF-8. However,  still limits the character set to ASCII, including  and  MIME encoding of non-ASCII data.

The Internet community generally adds features by extension, allowing communication in both directions between upgraded machines and not-yet-upgraded machines, rather than declaring formerly standards-compliant legacy software to be "broken" and insisting that all software worldwide be upgraded to the latest standard. In the mid-1990s, people objected to "just send 8 bits (to  SMTP servers)", perhaps because of a perception that "just send 8 bits" is an implicit declaration that ISO 8859-1 become the new "standard encoding", forcing everyone in the world to use the same character set. Instead, the recommended way to take advantage of 8-bit-clean links between machines is to use the ESMTP 8BITMIME extension for message bodies and the SMTP SMTPUTF8 extension for message headers. This "just-send-8" attitude does not in fact cause problems in practice, since virtually all modern email servers are 8-bit clean.

See also 
 32-bit clean

References 

Character encoding